São Lucas is a district in the eastern part of the city of São Paulo, Brazil.

References 

Districts of São Paulo